The 1967 Washington Senators season involved the Senators finishing 6th in the American League with a record of 76 wins and 85 losses.

Offseason
 November 30, 1966: Don Lock was traded by the Senators to the Philadelphia Phillies for Darold Knowles and cash.
 December 3, 1966: Ron Kline was traded by the Senators to the Minnesota Twins for Bernie Allen and Camilo Pascual.
 January 28, 1967: Jan Dukes was drafted by the Senators in the 1st round (8th pick) of the 1967 Major League Baseball Draft Secondary Phase.

Regular season

Opening Day starters
Bernie Allen
Ed Brinkman
Doug Camilli
Frank Howard
Ken McMullen
Dick Nen
Cap Peterson
Pete Richert
Fred Valentine

Season standings

Record vs. opponents

Notable transactions
 May 29, 1967: Pete Richert was traded by the Senators to the Baltimore Orioles for Mike Epstein and Frank Bertaina.
 June 6, 1967: 1967 Major League Baseball Draft
Bobby Jones was drafted by the Senators in the 36th round.
Paul Reuschel was drafted by the Senators in the 3rd round of the secondary phase, but did not sign.
 June 15, 1967: Jim King was traded by the Senators to the Chicago White Sox for Ed Stroud. King was the last of the original 1961 Washington Senator players.

Roster

Player stats

Batting

Starters by position
Note: Pos = Position; G = Games played; AB = At bats; H = Hits; Avg. = Batting average; HR = Home runs; RBI = Runs batted in

Other batters
Note: G = Games played; AB = At bats; H = Hits; Avg. = Batting average; HR = Home runs; RBI = Runs batted in

Pitching

Starting pitchers
Note: G = Games pitched; IP = Innings pitched; W = Wins; L = Losses; ERA = Earned run average; SO = Strikeouts

Other pitchers
Note: G = Games pitched; IP = Innings pitched; W = Wins; L = Losses; ERA = Earned run average; SO = Strikeouts

Relief pitchers
Note: G = Games pitched; W = Wins; L = Losses; SV = Saves; ERA = Earned run average; SO = Strikeouts

Farm system

Notes

References
1967 Washington Senators team page at Baseball Reference
1967 Washington Senators team page at www.baseball-almanac.com

Texas Rangers seasons
Washington Senators season
Washing